Houdini is a 1953 American Technicolor film biography from Paramount Pictures, produced by George Pal and Berman Swarttz, directed by George Marshall, that stars Tony Curtis and Janet Leigh. The film's screenplay, based upon the life of magician and escape artist Harry Houdini, was written by Philip Yordan, based on the book Houdini by Harold Kellock. The film's music score was by Roy Webb and the cinematography by Ernest Laszlo. The art direction was by Albert Nozaki and Hal Pereira, and the costume design by Edith Head.
  
The film's storyline is a fictionalized account of Houdini's life. It details his beginnings as a carnival performer, later as a worker in a safe factory, and finally his international success as a world-renowned escape artist and stage magician. Following the death of his mother, he exposes various fraudulent mediums in the spiritualist movement, while always hoping to make contact with her. The film also follows his love for his wife Bess Houdini and his most dangerous stunts and stage illusions.

Plot
In the 1890s, young Harry Houdini (Tony Curtis) is performing with a Coney Island carnival as Bruto, the Wild Man, when Bess (Janet Leigh), a naive onlooker, tries to protect him from the blows of Schultz (Sig Ruman), his "trainer". Harry then appears as magician "The Great Houdini" and, spotting Bess in the audience, invites her on stage. Harry flirts with the unsuspecting Bess during his act, but she flees from him in a panic. When Bess shows up to watch Harry perform two more times, he finally is able to corner her. Bess admits her attraction, and soon after, the two appear at Harry's mother's house, newly married. Bess becomes Harry's onstage partner, touring the country with him, but soon grows tired of the low pay and grueling schedule.

After Bess convinces Harry to take a job in a locksmith factory, Harry works as a lock tester while fantasizing about escaping from one of the factory's large safes. On Halloween, Harry and Bess attend a special magicians' dinner at the Hotel Astor, during which magician Fante offers a prize to anyone who can free himself from a straitjacket. Harry accepts the challenge and, through intense concentration, extricates himself from the jacket, greatly impressing Fante. Afterward, however, Fante advises Harry to "drop it", noting that Johann Von Schweger, a German magician, retired at the height of his career after performing a similar feat, fearful of his own talents. Bess then persuades Harry to give her the prize, a single, round-trip boat ticket to Europe, so that she can cash it in for a down payment on a house.

Later at the factory, Harry locks himself inside one of the big safes, determined to make an escape. Before he can get out, however, the foreman orders the safe blown open, then fires Harry. That night, in front of his mother (Angela Clarke), Harry and Bess argue about their future, and frustrated by Bess's insistence that he quit magic, Harry walks out. Soon, a contrite Bess finds Harry performing with a carnival and presents him with two one-way tickets to Europe. Sometime later, at a London theater, Harry and Bess are concluding their magic act when a reporter named Dooley (Michael Pate) challenges Harry to break out of one of Scotland Yard's notoriously secure jail cells. Harry, who hired Dooley to issue the challenge, accepts, unaware that the cells do not have locks in the doors, but are mounted on the outside walls. Despite the added difficulty, the dexterous, determined Houdini picks his cell lock and appears on time for his next performance. Now billed as the "man who escaped from Scotland Yard", Harry begins a successful tour of Europe with Bess.

In Berlin Harry is joined by his mother and begins searching for the reclusive Von Schweger. While performing an impromptu levitation trick with Bess at a restaurant, Harry is arrested for fraud. During his trial, Harry denies that he ever made claims to supernatural powers, insisting that all his tricks are accomplished through physical means. To prove his point, Harry locks himself in a safe in the courtroom and breaks out a few minutes later, after which Bess explains to Harry's mother that safe locks are designed to keep thieves out, not in. Vindicated, Harry then goes to see Von Schweger, who finally has responded to his queries, but learns from Von Schweger's assistant, Otto (Torin Thatcher), that the magician died two days earlier. Otto reveals that Von Schweger summoned Harry to ask him the secret of "dematerialization", a feat he accomplished once but could not repeat. Although Harry demurs, Otto insists on becoming Harry's new assistant and travels with him to New York City.

There, Harry finds he is virtually unknown, so for publicity, he hangs upside down on a skyscraper flagpole, constrained by a straitjacket. Harry executes the escape and soon makes a name for himself in America.  To prepare to be submerged in a box in the cold Detroit River, Harry bathes in an ice-filled bathtub. During the trick, which takes place on Halloween, the chain holding the box breaks, and it drops upside down into an opening in the ice-covered river. Although Harry manages to escape from the box, the current drags him downstream, and he struggles to find air pockets under the ice and swim back to the opening. Above, Bess and the horrified audience assume Harry has drowned and proclaim his demise. To Bess's relief, Harry shows up later at their hotel, saying that he heard his mother's voice, directing him toward the opening. Just then, Harry receives word that his mother died at the exact time that he heard her voice call to him.

Two years later in New York, Harry, who has not performed since his mother's death, reveals to Simms (Douglas Spencer), a reporter, that he has been trying to contact his mother's spirit, without success. Harry invites Simms to attend a seance with him, and after the medium appears to have communicated with his mother, Harry and Otto expose her as a fake. After a public crusade against phony mediums, Harry decides to return to the stage and builds a watery torture cell for the occasion. Terrified, Bess threatens to leave Harry unless he drops the dangerous trick, and he agrees not to perform it. Before the show, Harry admits to Otto that his appendix is tender, but goes on, despite the pain. When the audience noisily demands that he perform the advertised "water torture" trick, Harry succumbs and is immersed, upside down, in a tank of water. Weak, Harry cannot execute the escape and loses consciousness. Otto breaks the tank's glass, and after reviving, the now-dying Harry vows to a weeping Bess that, if possible, he will come back.

Cast
 Tony Curtis as Harry Houdini
 Janet Leigh as Bess Houdini
 Torin Thatcher as Otto 
 Angela Clarke as Harry's Mother 
 Stefan Schnabel as German Prosecuting Attorney 
 Ian Wolfe as Malue 
 Sig Ruman as Schultz 
 Michael Pate as Dooley 
 Connie Gilchrist as Mrs. Shultz 
 Malcolm Lee Beggs as British Jail Warden 
 Frank Orth as Mr. Hunter 
 Barry Bernard as Inspector Marlick
 Douglas Spencer as Simms
 Fred Aldrich as Waiter/Bouncer (uncredited)
 Lyle Latell as Calcott (uncredited)

Production
In September 1951, it was announced that Paramount had bought The Life of Houdini and that George Pal would produce. Hedda Hopper suggested Orson Welles, who was a magician, would be an ideal star. Pal said he would make it after War of the Worlds.

Barré Lyndon wrote the first screenplay then Philip Yordan wrote another version.  The distinguished magician, escapologist, and mentalist Joseph Dunninger, credited as "Dunninger", was technical adviser on the film. Dunninger was a good friend to many notables in the magic community including Houdini himself, Francis Martinka, and Tony Slydini.

In July 1952, Paramount announced that Tony Curtis and Janet Leigh would star under the direction of George Marshall. Curtis was borrowed from Universal, where he was under contract; he said he was delighted to make the film, as he had mainly been in action films up until that time. Leigh was borrowed from MGM. It would be the first time Curtis and Leigh, who were married, appeared together on screen. Leigh later said "Metro [MGM] was not very happy about the idea of loaning me to Paramount, but I was excited at the thought of doing it". Curtis wrote in his memoirs that he "wasn't sure if this was the best thing for my own career" as he did not always want to be associated with his wife.

To prepare for the role, Curtis trained with magician George Boston for one month. Joe Dunninger did the illusions. Leigh said she and Curtis learned the illusions "so that it wouldn't have to be done with camera trickery. When Tony levitated me, there were no cuts, and there were none during some of the other tricks — they were done "legit"." Leigh said, however, that the escape scenes were "fixed because Tony wasn't Houdini; he didn't have the ability to contort his body or to manipulate the locks like Houdini did. Houdini had tremendous spiritual energy. He could get his body into positions that were just [laughs] not human".

The film was originally meant to be shot in black-and-white, but the decision was made during pre-production to film it in color to take full advantage of the costumes and sets.

Leigh said Curtis received ice burns in the scene where he had to sit in a bathtub full of ice. She added that the last third of the film focused on Houdini seeing if he could contact his dead mother "rather than his wonderful ability and the love between the two of them. I agree that the last part of Houdini was much harder to pull off. Houdini was exposing the falsity of these charlatans [spiritualists], and I think it was more difficult for audiences to 
accept that phase of the picture, especially at that time".

Leigh enjoyed working with Curtis, and they would go on to make four more feature films together.

Reception
Curtis said the film "was very successful. My secret hope, however, was that Houdini was going to propel me into a whole new kind of filmmaking, where I would be recognized as the serious actor I had always wanted to be. When that didn't happen I was terribly disappointed."

References

Bibliography

 Hickman, Gail Morgan. The Films of George Pal. South Brunswick, New Jersey:  A. S. Barnes and Company, Inc., 1977. .

External links
 
 
 
 
 A look back at HOUDINI (1953) at Wild About Harry

1953 films
1950s biographical drama films
American biographical drama films
Films scored by Roy Webb
Films about magic and magicians
American films based on actual events
Films directed by George Marshall
Films produced by George Pal
Paramount Pictures films
Cultural depictions of Harry Houdini
Films set in the 1890s
Films set in the 1900s
Films set in the 1910s
Films set in the 1920s
Films set in amusement parks
1953 drama films
1950s English-language films
1950s American films